Sapho is a genus of damselfly in the family Calopterygidae.

References

Calopterygidae